Riverton is a borough located in Burlington County, in the U.S. state of New Jersey. As of the 2020 United States census, the borough's population was 2,764, a decrease of 15 (−.5%) from the 2010 census count of 2,779, which in turn reflected an increase of 20 (+0.7%) from the 2,759 counted in the 2000 census.

Riverton was incorporated as a borough by an act of the New Jersey Legislature on December 18, 1893, from portions of Cinnaminson Township, based on the results of a referendum held six days earlier. Portions of the borough were taken to form Palmyra Township on April 19, 1894. The borough's name is derived from The Riverton Improvement Company, which was established after a group of ten purchased a  that would be the site of a planned community with homes erected for many of the founders along the riverfront.

It is a dry town, where alcohol cannot be sold legally. The borough's dry status was an early character of the borough, with a clause inserted starting in 1952 by the Riverton Improvement Company into deeds for all properties in the community that prohibited the sale or manufacture of alcoholic beverages.

The borough is located on the Delaware River and is pedestrian-friendly, with sidewalks, gas lamps, and Victorian architecture. Riverton is home to the Riverton Yacht Club, one of the oldest active yacht clubs in the country. Many residents' sailboats make their home at this landmark.

History

Riverton was established in 1851, along the Delaware River, having been laid out by Philadelphia architect Samuel Sloan.  According to architectural historian Henry Russell Hitchcock, Riverton was one of the first totally planned residential subdivisions in the United States.

The Japanese beetle, now a widespread invasive insect pest in the United States, were first discovered in a nursery near Riverton in 1916.

Geography
According to the United States Census Bureau, the borough had a total area of 0.96 square miles (2.50 km2), including 0.66 square miles (1.71 km2) of land and 0.30 square miles (0.78 km2) of water (31.46%).

The borough borders Cinnaminson Township and Palmyra in Burlington County; and Philadelphia, across the Delaware River in Pennsylvania.

Demographics

2010 census

The Census Bureau's 2006–2010 American Community Survey showed that (in 2010 inflation-adjusted dollars) median household income was $94,762 (with a margin of error of +/− $6,688) and the median family income was $112,721 (+/− $9,113). Males had a median income of $81,078 (+/− $9,544) versus $50,517 (+/− $6,553) for females. The per capita income for the borough was $47,945 (+/− $4,715). About 3.4% of families and 4.2% of the population were below the poverty line, including 5.4% of those under age 18 and 2.4% of those age 65 or over.

2000 census
As of the 2000 United States census there were  2,759 people, 1,066 households, and 746 families residing in the borough. The racial makeup of the borough was 95.83% White, 1.78% African American, 0.11% Native American, 0.83% Asian, 0.00% Pacific Islander, 0.29% from other races, and 1.16% from two or more races.  1.09% of the population were Hispanic or Latino of any race.

There were 1,066 households, out of which 30.7% had children under the age of 18 living with them, 58.7% were married couples living together, 8.4% had a female householder with no husband present, and 30.0% were non-families. Another 25.3% of all households were made up of individuals, and 8.1% had someone living alone who was 65 years of age or older. The average household size was 2.48 and the average family size was 3.00.

In the borough the population was spread out, with 21.8% under the age of 18, 4.3% from 18 to 24, 29.8% from 25 to 44, 24.8% from 45 to 64, and 19.3% who were 65 years of age or older. The median age was 42 years. For every 100 females, there were 90.3 males. For every 100 females age 18 and over, there were 88.8 males.

The median income for a household in the borough was $58,977, and the median income for a family was $68,125. Males had a median income of $50,950 versus $36,042 for females. The per capita income for the borough was $30,223. 3.1% of the population and 2.0% of families were below the poverty line. Out of the total population, 4.5% of those under the age of 18 and 2.4% of those 65 and older were living below the poverty line.

Government

Local government
Riverton is governed under the Borough form of New Jersey municipal government, which is used in 218 municipalities (of the 564) statewide, making it the most common form of government in New Jersey. The governing body is comprised of a Mayor and a Borough Council, with all positions elected at-large on a partisan basis as part of the November general election. A Mayor is elected directly by the voters to a four-year term of office. The Borough Council is comprised of six members elected to serve three-year terms on a staggered basis, with two seats coming up for election each year in a three-year cycle. The Borough form of government used by Riverton is a "weak mayor / strong council" government in which council members act as the legislative body with the mayor presiding at meetings and voting only in the event of a tie. The mayor can veto ordinances subject to an override by a two-thirds majority vote of the council. The mayor makes committee and liaison assignments for council members, and most appointments are made by the mayor with the advice and consent of the council.

, the Mayor of Riverton is Republican Suzanne Cairns Wells, whose term of office ends December 31, 2023. Members of the Riverton Borough Council are Council President William Corbi (R, 2024), Kirk Fullerton (R, 2022), Laura Major (R, 2022), James Quinn (D, 2023), Julie Scott (R, 2024) and Edgar Wilburn (D, 2023).

In January 2016, the Borough Council selected Kirk Fullerton from three names nominated by the Republican municipal committee to fill the seat expiring in December 2016 that was vacated by Susan Cairns Wells when she took office as mayor.

Federal, state and county representation
Riverton is located in the 3rd Congressional District and is part of New Jersey's 7th state legislative district.

 

Burlington County is governed by a Board of County Commissioners comprised of five members who are chosen at-large in partisan elections to serve three-year terms of office on a staggered basis, with either one or two seats coming up for election each year; at an annual reorganization meeting, the board selects a director and deputy director from among its members to serve a one-year term. , Burlington County's Commissioners are
Director Felicia Hopson (D, Willingboro Township, term as commissioner ends December 31, 2024; term as director ends 2023),
Deputy Director Tom Pullion (D, Edgewater Park, term as commissioner and as deputy director ends 2023),
Allison Eckel (D, Medford, 2025),
Daniel J. O'Connell (D, Delran Township, 2024) and 
Balvir Singh (D, Burlington Township, 2023). 
Burlington County's Constitutional Officers are
County Clerk Joanne Schwartz (R, Southampton Township, 2023)
Sheriff James H. Kostoplis (D, Bordentown, 2025) and 
Surrogate Brian J. Carlin (D, Burlington Township, 2026).

Politics
As of March 2011, there were a total of 1,893 registered voters in Riverton, of which 571 (30.2% vs. 33.3% countywide) were registered as Democrats, 724 (38.2% vs. 23.9%) were registered as Republicans and 597 (31.5% vs. 42.8%) were registered as Unaffiliated. There was one voter registered to another party. Among the borough's 2010 Census population, 68.1% (vs. 61.7% in Burlington County) were registered to vote, including 86.7% of those ages 18 and over (vs. 80.3% countywide).

In the 2012 presidential election, Democrat Barack Obama received 838 votes (55.5% vs. 58.1% countywide), ahead of Republican Mitt Romney with 638 votes (42.3% vs. 40.2%) and other candidates with 23 votes (1.5% vs. 1.0%), among the 1,509 ballots cast by the borough's 1,951 registered voters, for a turnout of 77.3% (vs. 74.5% in Burlington County). In the 2008 presidential election, Democrat Barack Obama received 912 votes (57.2% vs. 58.4% countywide), ahead of Republican John McCain with 659 votes (41.3% vs. 39.9%) and other candidates with 16 votes (1.0% vs. 1.0%), among the 1,594 ballots cast by the borough's 1,919 registered voters, for a turnout of 83.1% (vs. 80.0% in Burlington County). In the 2004 presidential election, Democrat John Kerry received 858 votes (54.4% vs. 52.9% countywide), ahead of Republican George W. Bush with 693 votes (43.9% vs. 46.0%) and other candidates with 14 votes (0.9% vs. 0.8%), among the 1,578 ballots cast by the borough's 1,877 registered voters, for a turnout of 84.1% (vs. 78.8% in the whole county).

In the 2013 gubernatorial election, Republican Chris Christie received 591 votes (62.3% vs. 61.4% countywide), ahead of Democrat Barbara Buono with 328 votes (34.6% vs. 35.8%) and other candidates with 13 votes (1.4% vs. 1.2%), among the 949 ballots cast by the borough's 1,930 registered voters, yielding a 49.2% turnout (vs. 44.5% in the county). In the 2009 gubernatorial election, Republican Chris Christie received 502 votes (46.1% vs. 47.7% countywide), ahead of Democrat Jon Corzine with 482 votes (44.3% vs. 44.5%), Independent Chris Daggett with 85 votes (7.8% vs. 4.8%) and other candidates with 9 votes (0.8% vs. 1.2%), among the 1,089 ballots cast by the borough's 1,902 registered voters, yielding a 57.3% turnout (vs. 44.9% in the county).

Historic district

The Riverton Historic District is a  historic district encompassing the borough. It was added to the National Register of Historic Places on March 5, 1999, for its significance in architecture, community planning and development. The district has 371 contributing buildings, including the Riverton Yacht Club.

The Victorian house at 503 Bank Avenue was designed by architect Samuel Sloan and built in 1851. The Riverton Yacht Club was built in 1880 with Stick style.

Education
The Riverton School District serves students in public school in pre-kindergarten through eighth grade at Riverton Elementary School. As of the 2020–21 school year, the district, comprised of one school, had an enrollment of 294 students and 27.7 classroom teachers (on an FTE basis), for a student–teacher ratio of 10.6:1.

For ninth through twelfth grades, public school students attend Palmyra High School as part of a sending/receiving relationship with the Palmyra Public Schools, along with students from Beverly. As of the 2020–21 school year, the high school had an enrollment of 378 students and 31.0 classroom teachers (on an FTE basis), for a student–teacher ratio of 12.2:1.

Students from Riverton, and from all of Burlington County, are eligible to attend the Burlington County Institute of Technology, a countywide public school district that serves the vocational and technical education needs of students at the high school and post-secondary level at its campuses in Medford and Westampton.

Transportation

Roads and highways

No Interstate, U.S. or state highways directly serve Riverton. The most prominent road crossing the borough is County Route 543.

Public transportation
The Riverton station located on Main Street provides service on the River Line light rail system, offering southbound service to Camden and the Walter Rand Transportation Center with connections to PATCO Speedline trains to Philadelphia and the Camden County suburbs and northbound service to the Trenton Rail Station with connections to NJ Transit trains to New York City, SEPTA trains to Philadelphia and Amtrak trains.

NJ Transit provides bus service in the borough on the 419 route that runs between Camden and Burlington.

BurLink bus service is offered on the B8 route between the Riverside station and Hartford Crossing / Delran Township.

Notable people

People who were born in, residents of, or otherwise closely associated with Riverton include:

 John Fraser (1825–1906), architect who served as acting supervisory architect for the United States Department of the Treasury, created a master plan for the United States Capitol grounds and served on the commission to complete the Washington Monument
 Nat Gertler (born 1965), writer best known for his comics and his books about comic books
 Lloyd Carpenter Griscom (1872–1959), American diplomat
 Charles Wellford Leavitt (1871–1928), landscape architect, urban planner and civil engineer
 Frank A. Mathews Jr. (1904–1964), represented  in the United States House of Representatives from 1945 to 1949
 Philip Slater (1927–2013), sociologist who wrote the 1970 work The Pursuit of Loneliness
 F. Trowbridge vom Baur (1908–2000), lawyer who was General Counsel of the Navy from 1953 to 1960

References

External links

 Riverton Borough website

 
1893 establishments in New Jersey
Borough form of New Jersey government
Boroughs in Burlington County, New Jersey
Populated places established in 1893
New Jersey populated places on the Delaware River